Eldora–New Providence Community School District is a rural public school district headquartered in Eldora, Iowa.  it has a grade-sharing arrangement with Hubbard–Radcliffe Community School District and operates as "South Hardin Community Schools".

It is mostly in Hardin County, with sections in Grundy and Marshall counties. The district serves Eldora, New Providence, and Owasa.

The district formed on July 1, 1980, with the merger of the Eldora and New Providence school districts. From 1997 to 2006 the district enrollment decreased by 125 students, or 16% of the original total. It began a grade-sharing arrangement with Hubbard–Radcliffe in 2006, with the former housing senior high school and the latter hosting middle school. In 2017 there was a proposal to continue the arrangement until 2023. This was done as other area districts had increased ties and/or consolidated altogether.

Schools
Prior to the grade sharing arrangement, the schools were ENP Elementary School, ENP Middle School, and ENP High School.
They are now:
ENP Elementary, Eldora
South Hardin Middle School, Hubbard (see Hubbard–Radcliffe Community School District)
South Hardin High School, Eldora

South Hardin High School

Athletics 
The Tigers compete in the North Iowa Cedar League Conference in the following sports:

Cross country
Volleyball
Football
Basketball
Wrestling
Track and field 
Golf 
Tennis
Baseball 
Softball

Enrollment

See also
List of school districts in Iowa
List of high schools in Iowa

References

External links
 South Hardin Community Schools (joint website of Eldora–New Providence Community School District and Hubbard–Radcliffe Community School District)
 

1980 establishments in Iowa
School districts established in 1980
School districts in Iowa
Education in Grundy County, Iowa
Education in Hardin County, Iowa
Education in Marshall County, Iowa